The 1977 GP Ouest-France was the 41st edition of the GP Ouest-France cycle race and was held on 23 August 1977. The race started and finished in Plouay. The race was won by Jacques Bossis.

General classification

References

1977
1977 in road cycling
1977 in French sport